Sir John Dunlop, 1st Baronet, of Dunlop (1806 – 3 April 1839) was a British Army officer and politician.

Life
The eldest son of Lieutenant-General James Dunlop of Dunlop, he served in the 1st Grenadier Guards. He was Member of Parliament for Kilmarnock Burghs from 1832 to 1835. Styled Captain John Dunlop of Dunlop at the time of election, he was then created a baronet in 1838.

Dunlop was either a Whig or a Radical.  He was succeeded by John Bowring.

Family
Dunlop married:

Charlotte Constance, youngest daughter of Major General Sir Richard Downes Jackson, in 1829.
Harriet, daughter of Archibald Primrose, 4th Earl of Rosebery.

James Dunlop, 2nd Baronet was son of the first marriage.

References 

1806 births
1839 deaths
Members of the Parliament of the United Kingdom for Scottish constituencies
UK MPs 1832–1835
Baronets in the Baronetage of the United Kingdom
Grenadier Guards officers